The 2011 Women's Four Nations Hockey Tournament was the second of two women's field hockey tournaments, consisting of a series of test matches. It was held in Mendoza, Argentina, from February 16 to 20, 2011, and featured four of the top nations in women's field hockey.

Competition format
The tournament featured the national teams of Australia, Germany, the United States, and the hosts, Argentina, competing in a round-robin format, with each team playing each other once. Three points will be awarded for a win, one for a draw, and none for a loss.

Officials
The following umpires were appointed by the International Hockey Federation to officiate the tournament:

 Amy Hassick (USA)
 Catalina Montesino Wenzel (CHL)
 Irene Presenqui (ARG)
 Gaby Schmitz (GER)
 Kylie Seymour (AUS)

Results
All times are local (Argentina Standard Time).

Preliminary round

Fixtures

Classification round

Third and fourth place

Final

Awards
The following awards were presented at the conclusion of the tournament:

Statistics

Final standings

Goalscorers

References

Four Nations Tournament
hockey
International women's field hockey competitions hosted by Argentina
Sport in Rosario, Santa Fe
Women's Four Nations Hockey Tournament